Ken Currie (born 1960 in North Shields, Northumberland, England) is a Scottish artist and a graduate of Glasgow School of Art (1978–1983). Ken grew up in industrial Glasgow. This has had a significant influence on his early works. In the 1980s Currie produced a series of works that romanticised Red Clydeside depicting heroic Dockworkers, Shop-stewards and urban areas along the River Clyde. These works were also in response to then British Prime Minister Margaret Thatcher's policies that he believed were the greatest threat to culture of labour.

Works

Currie's paintings show a profound interest in the body (physical and metaphorical) and the "terror" of mortality. His works are primarily concerned with how the human body is affected by illness, ageing and physical injury. Closely related to these themes, his work also deals with social and political issues and philosophical questions. Although many of the images dealing with metaphysical questions do not feature figures, a human presence is nevertheless suggested.

He was labeled as one of the "New Glasgow Boys" along with Peter Howson, Adrian Wiszniewski and Steven Campbell who studied together at the Glasgow School of Art.

His Glasgow History Mural was commissioned on the 200th anniversary of the Calton weavers massacre in 1787 and is displayed on the ceiling of the People's Palace.

He has occasionally worked as a portraitist. Three Oncologists (2002) is in the collection of the Scottish National Portrait Gallery; it depicts Professor Robert J Steele, Professor Sir Alfred Cuschieri and Professor Sir David P Lane,  three doctors from Ninewells Hospital, Dundee, in a "haunting", "spectral" painting that reflects the popular fear of cancer.

Currie was commissioned by the University of Edinburgh to paint a portrait of Peter Higgs, the theoretical physicist, which was unveiled in 2009. He is a "reluctant portraitist", and this was only his second portrait.
He said, referring to the Higgs boson, "I am very interested in Peter's work. I don't for one second claim to grasp the theory, but I do understand the sublime, and there is a sublime quality to it all, a beauty, an awesome quality. In some respects, the subject is quite terrifying."

Most recently, Currie painted a large-scale portrait of preeminent forensic anthropologist Professor Dame Sue Black titled Unknown Man (2019). Currie's portrait is on long-term loan to the Scottish National Portrait Gallery and is displayed publicly. Ken Currie expressed he was, “delighted to be able to loan the painting Unknown Man to the Scottish National Portrait Gallery. This will make the painting more accessible to a wider public and hopefully draw attention to the astonishing work that Sue Black has undertaken in her long career as an Anatomist and Forensic Anthropologist throughout the world”.

The idea for the portrait came to fruition when Currie and Professor Black crossed paths during a BBC Radio 4 programme, The Anatomy Lesson, which featured discussion around the relationship between art and anatomy. Following on from this meeting, Currie was invited to Professor Black's workplace at the University of Dundee, where she gave him a tour of the dissection room. The artist was so moved by what he witnessed and encountered, he later asked Professor Black to sit for a portrait.

Christopher Baker, National Galleries Scotland, director of European and Scottish art and portraiture, said: “Encounters between accomplished artists and subjects can have electrifying results and that is certainly the case with this powerful portrait of the distinguished forensic scientist Professor Dame Sue Black by Ken Currie".

Bibliography
Exhibition Catalogs
Ken Currie: Tragic Forms [Catalogue of the exhibition held at Flowers 2016] London.
Ken Currie: Immortality [Catalogue of the exhibition held at Flowers  2010] London.
Ken Currie: Animals [Catalogue of the exhibition held at Flowers 2008] London.

Monographs
 Tom Normand, Ken Currie: Details of a Journey, Lund Humphries Publishers (1 June 2002), 
 Ken Currie, Ken Currie Painting & Sculpture, 1995–96, Panart Publishing Limited (1 January 1996) 
 Harrison, J. and Topp, G. (1995) Ken Currie: The Fourth Triptych and Other Works. Cleveland County Council.

References

External links
 Works in the National Galleries of Scotland
 Ken Currie's artist page on Flowers Gallery
 : works by Ken Currie in British public collections

1960 births
Living people
People from North Shields
Alumni of the Glasgow School of Art
20th-century Scottish painters
Scottish male painters
21st-century Scottish painters
21st-century Scottish male artists
20th-century Scottish male artists